The Blue Star of the South (German: Der blaue Stern des Südens) is a 1951 Austrian comedy film directed by Wolfgang Liebeneiner and starring Viktor de Kowa, Gustav Knuth and Gretl Schörg.

It was shot at the Bavaria Studios in Munich and on location in Hamburg and Paris. The film's sets were designed by the art director Ernst H. Albrecht.

Cast
 Viktor de Kowa as Ivo 
 Gustav Knuth as Bruck 
 Gretl Schörg as Yella 
 Ernst Fritz Fürbringer as Niccolini 
 Charlott Daudert as Sonja 
 Ernst Waldow as Kriminalrat Dr. Klein 
 Hanna Ralph as Oberin Madeleine 
 Paula Braend as Frau Murtus 
 Katharina Mayberg as Nelitze 
 Michael Tellering as Frisco-Jim 
 Malte Jaeger as Marcel, ein Apache 
 Harald Mannl as Meyrink

References

Bibliography 
 Fritsche, Maria. Homemade Men in Postwar Austrian Cinema: Nationhood, Genre and Masculinity. Berghahn Books, 2013.

External links 
 

1951 films
1950s crime comedy films
Austrian crime comedy films
1950s German-language films
Films directed by Wolfgang Liebeneiner
Austrian black-and-white films
Films shot at Bavaria Studios
Films shot in Hamburg
Films shot in Paris